Kalochori-Panteichi is a village in Euboea regional unit, Greece. Since the 2011 local government reform it is part of the municipality Chalcis. The population was 922 inhabitants at the 2011 census. Although part of the Euboea regional unit, it is not located on the island Euboea, but on the mainland, attached to the northeastern part of Boeotia.

Transport
The village is severed by a railway station, with Suburban Railway services to Chalcis and Athens.

External links
Official website

References

Populated places in Euboea (regional unit)